George Henry Rogerson (13 March 1896 – 29 May 1961) was an English cricketer.  Born at Monks Coppenhall, Cheshire, he made twelve appearances in first-class cricket.

Having played for the Lancashire Second XI since 1921, Rogerson made his first-class cricket debut for Lancashire in 1923 against Oxford University at Oxford. He made eleven further appearances in first-class cricket in 1922, playing his final match for Lancashire in the County Championship against Hampshire. He scored a total of 340 runs in his twelve matches, with a high score of 47 not out and a batting average of 17.89.

He died at Crewe, Cheshire on 29 May 1961.

References

External links
George Rogerson at ESPNcricinfo
George Rogerson at CricketArchive

1896 births
1961 deaths
People from the Borough of Cheshire East
English cricketers
Lancashire cricketers
Cricketers from Cheshire